Gutner Point is a   Local Nature Reserve on Hayling Island in Hampshire. It is owned by Hampshire County Council and managed by Hampshire Countryside Service. It is part of Chichester and Langstone Harbours Ramsar site and   Special Protection Area, of Solent Maritime Special Area of Conservation, and of Chichester Harbour Site of Special Scientific Interest.

This site in Chichester Harbour has inter-tidal muds, grassland and saltmarsh. Flora includes sea-lavender. Many birds feed on invertebrates in the mud at low tide and rest on foreshore at high tide.

There is no public access to the site.

References

Local Nature Reserves in Hampshire